Brian Bansgrove (18 July 1941 – 29 December 2001) was a New Zealand gaffer (chief lighting technician for motion pictures) best known for his work on The Lord of the Rings film trilogy.

Andrew Lesnie, who won the 2002 Academy Award for Cinematography for The Lord of the Rings: The Fellowship of the Ring said that Bansgrove and his crew were the "key element" in helping him craft images for the three Lord of the Rings films during the 15-month shoot between mid-1999 and late 2000. At the nomination of the film for the 16th annual ASC awards (American Society of Cinematographers), Lesnie called him "one of the true legends of the Australian film industry" saying further that "he was an extremely close collaborator" in the lighting design. Lesnie described Bansgrove not only as a friend and colleague but as the "main reason for winning" the Academy Award. Lesnie dedicated his Academy Award to Bansgrove in his acceptance speech at the 74th Academy Awards Ceremony.

Filmography

Camera and electrical department 
 Avatar (2004): Gaffer
 The Lord of the Rings: The Return of the King (2003) Gaffer (supervising chief lighting technician)
 The Lord of the Rings: The Two Towers (2002) Gaffer (supervising chief lighting technician)
 The Lord of the Rings: The Fellowship of the Ring (2001) Gaffer (supervising chief lighting technician)
 A Bright Shining Lie (1998) Gaffer
 Welcome to Woop Woop (1997): Gaffer
 The Phantom (1996) Gaffer (uncredited)
 Operation Dumbo Drop (1995): Gaffer
 No Escape (1994): Gaffer
 Sniper (1993): Gaffer
 Turtle Beach (1992): Gaffer
 Sweet Talker (1991): Gaffer
 Almost an Angel (1990): Gaffer
 Prisoners of the Sun (1990): Gaffer
 Crocodile Dundee II (1988): Gaffer
 High Tide (1987): Gaffer
 The Perfectionist (1987): Gaffer
 Crocodile Dundee (1986): Gaffer
 Burk & Wills (1985): Gaffer
 Phar Lap (1983): Gaffer
 The Return of Captain Invincible (1983): Gaffer
 Stanley (1983): Gaffer
 The Year of Living Dangerously (1982): Gaffer
 Starstruck (1982): Gaffer
 Heatwave (1982): Gaffer
 Gallipoli (1981): Gaffer
 The Chain Reaction (1980): Gaffer
 Stir (1980): Gaffer
 The Girl who met Simone de Beauvoir in Paris (1980): Gaffer
 My Brilliant Career (1979): Gaffer
 Alison's Birthday (1979): Gaffer
 Cathy's Child (1979): Gaffer
 In Search of Anna (1978): Gaffer
 Newsfront (1978): Gaffer
 Journey among Woman (1977): Gaffer
 The Love Letters from Teralba Road (1977): Gaffer
 The F.J Holden (1977): Gaffer
 Break of Day (1976): Gaffer
 Mad Dog Morgan (1976): Gaffer
 The Trespassers (1976): Gaffer
 The Removalists (1975): Gaffer
 The Great McCarthy (1975): Gaffer
 The Man from Hong Kong (1975): Gaffer
 Promised Woman (1975): Gaffer
 Stone (1974): Gaffer
 27A (1974): Gaffer
 The Office Picnic (1973): Gaffer

Cinematographer 
 Now and Then (1979)
 And / Or = One (1978)

Miscellaneous 
 The Lord of the Rings: The Return of the King (2003): Dedicatee
 The Long and Short of It (2003): In loving memory
 Welcome to Woop Woop (1997): Cruise Director

References

External links

New York Times Filmography of Brian Bansgrove

1941 births
2001 deaths
New Zealand film producers